The 2019–20 Pittsburgh Panthers women's basketball team represented The University of Pittsburgh during the 2019–20 NCAA Division I women's basketball season. The Panthers, led by second year head coach Lance White, played their home games at the Petersen Events Center as members of the Atlantic Coast Conference.

The Panthers finished the season 5–26 and 1–17 in ACC play to finish in fifteenth place.  As the fifteenth seed in the ACC tournament, they defeated Notre Dame in the First Round before losing to Georgia Tech in the Second Round.  The NCAA tournament and WNIT were cancelled due to the COVID-19 outbreak.

Previous season
They finished the season 11–20, 2–14 in ACC play to finish in fourteenth place. They lost in the first round of the ACC women's tournament to Duke.  The Demon Deacons were not invited to post season play.

Off-season

Recruiting Class

Source:

Roster

Schedule

Source:

|-
!colspan=9 style=| Non-Conference Regular season

|-
!colspan=9 style=| ACC Regular season

|-
!colspan=9 style=| ACC Women's Tournament

References

Pittsburgh Panthers women's basketball seasons
Pittsburgh
Pittsburgh
Pittsburgh